General elections were held in Guam on November 3, 1998. A Democratic Party primary was held to decide the party's gubernatorial candidates on 7 September.

Governor
Incumbent Democrat Carl Gutierrez was re-elected to his second term. This was the last time a Democrat won statewide office on Guam until 2018, when Lou Leon Guerrero won the gubernatorial election over Republican lieutenant governor Ray Tenorio.

Primary election

Democratic

General election

Legislature

Results

Delegate

Results

References

1998
General election
Guamanian general election
General election
1998
Guam
Guamanian general election